High Level may refer to:

Computing
High Level Architecture (simulation), a military computer simulation framework
High-level assembler, a type of assembly language translator
High-level design, an initial stage in software design
High-level document, a standard in software inspection
High-level programming language, a type of computer programming language

Geography
High Level, a town in northern Alberta, Canada
High Level Airport, the airport for High Level, Alberta

Other
Hi-Level, a type of passenger railcar
High- and low-level, classification levels in the description of systems
High-level waste, a type of nuclear waste
High Level, a DC Comics/Vertigo Comics series which debuted in 2019

See also
High Level Bridge (disambiguation)